Madeline Swegle (formerly Madeline Manhertz) is a United States Naval Aviator. She is the U.S. Navy's first black female tactical jet pilot.

Career

Swegle is currently a
Lieutenant in the U.S. Navy. She is from Burke, Virginia.

She is a 2013 graduate of Lake Braddock Secondary School and a 2017 graduate of the U.S. Naval Academy. She participated in track and field throughout her time in high school and college.

She reported to VT-21 in Kingsville, Texas to complete the Tactical Air Strike pilot training syllabus, which she completed on July 7, 2020, making her the first black female tactical jet pilot in the U.S. Navy.

See also

 History of the United States Navy
 List of women's firsts
 Women in war

References
VFW Magazine February 2021 page 24

External links
 

Year of birth missing (living people)
Living people
Women United States Naval Aviators
United States Naval Aviators
African-American female military personnel
United States Naval Academy alumni
21st-century African-American women
African-American United States Navy personnel